Defective by Design (DBD) is an anti-DRM initiative by the Free Software Foundation. Digital rights management (DRM) technology restricts users' ability to freely use their purchased movies, music, literature, software, and hardware in ways they are accustomed to with ordinary non-restricted media (such as books and audio compact discs). As a result, DRM has been described as "digital restrictions management" or "digital restrictions mechanisms" by opponents.

The philosophy of the initiative is that DRM is designed to be deliberately defective, to restrict the use of the product. This, they claim, cripples the future of digital freedom. The group aims to target "Big Media, unhelpful manufacturers, and DRM distributors" and to bring public awareness of the issue and increase participation in the initiative. It represents one of the first efforts of the Free Software Foundation to find common cause with mainstream social activists, and to encourage free software advocates to become socially involved. As of late 2006, the campaign was claiming over 12,000 registered members.

View on the impact of DRM 

DRM is used to encrypt various multimedia products (including audio, video, and console games) and is intended to restrict the uses of a product to those the rights holders intend. Examples of DRM functionality include limiting or prohibiting duplication of media to attempt to prevent copyright infringement or lawful archiving and sharing of media, encrypting or blocking access to a system's input or output to prevent the usage of non-licensed products, such as a competitor's hardware or media, preventing users from duplicating a CD or a DVD, preventing advertisements on DVDs from being skipped, and preventing interoperability between competing products. Although tech-savvy users are often able to find a way around DRM, this can be difficult and may require use of the analog hole. For others, DRM might prevent them from using media in legal ways.

In addition to restricting copying of DRM-restricted media, DRM can allow a computer to systematically disobey its owner.

History 

Defective By Design is a joint effort by the Free Software Foundation and CivicActions, a company that develops online advocacy campaigns. The chief organizers are Gregory Heller of CivicActions, Peter T. Brown, executive director of the Free Software Foundation, and Henry Poole, a CivicActions member who is also a director of the Free Software Foundation.

The campaign was launched in May 2006, with an anti-DRM protest at WinHEC. The protest featured Free Software Foundation (FSF) members in yellow hazmat suits "handing out pamphlets explaining that Microsoft products are – in the words of the key slogan for the campaign – 'defective by design' because of the DRM technologies included in them".

Since then, the campaign has launched a number of actions with varying degrees of success. The campaign claims that its phone-in campaign against the Recording Industry Association of America and related organizations around the world resulted in thousands of calls from people questioning the industry's position on DRM. On the other hand, efforts to meet with Bono of U2, a prominent supporter of Apple's DRM-regulated iTunes, have so far met with no success. However, four major record labels dropped their pending lawsuits and joined with Apple and Microsoft to eliminate Digital Rights Management from music sales.

DefectiveByDesign.org proclaimed October 3, 2006, to be a "Day Against DRM", and organized several events outside key Apple stores in the US and the UK. Hazmat suits were again worn by protesters and leaflets were handed out to the public explaining Apple's use of DRM in their iTunes music store and on their iPod media players.

On January 30, 2007, the campaign organized along with the BadVista campaign at the Times Square. Protesters in hazmat suits then handed literature to attendants about the dangers of Windows Vista's Digital Rights Management and Trusted Computing features, as well as handing out CDs containing a free software replacement for Windows Vista.

Campaigns

Tagging campaign 
Since 2007, the Defective by Design site encourages users to use the tagging feature of Amazon.com, Slashdot and on other sites that allow tagging, to mark certain products with the 'defectivebydesign' tag. Items targeted include DVD players, DRM-restricted DVD titles, HD DVD and Blu-ray Disc titles, Windows XP and higher, the Zune, and the iPod.

#CancelNetflix campaign 
In 2013, the Defective by Design site started a tagging campaign against Netflix, an online commercial stream service that developed new implementations of DRM for the web, to challenge W3C's decision of introducing DRM to web technologies. Despite the popularity of the campaign, W3C showed greenlight for DRM.

See also 

 Broadcast Protection Discussion Group
 Free Software Foundation anti-Windows campaigns
 Hardware restrictions
 Planned obsolescence
 Tivoization
 Trusted Computing

References

External links 
 
 

Free Software Foundation
Intellectual property activism
Information technology organizations based in North America
Creative Commons-licensed websites
Copyright campaigns
Digital rights management
Hardware restrictions
Digital rights
2006 neologisms
American advertising slogans